Round Hill is a rural residential locality in the local government area (LGA) of Burnie in the North-west and west LGA region of Tasmania. The 2016 census recorded a population of 109 for the state suburb of Round Hill.

History 
Round Hill was gazetted as a locality in 1974. 

It is believed that the hill (Round Hill) in the locality was named by George Bass in 1798, during his circumnavigation of Van Diemen's Land with Matthew Flinders.

Geography
The waters of Bass Strait form the northern boundary. The Western Railway Line passes through from north-east to north-west.

Road infrastructure 
National Route 1 (Bass Highway) runs through from north-east to north-west.

References

Towns in Tasmania
Burnie, Tasmania